College Park station may refer to:

 College Park station (MARTA), a MARTA station in Atlanta, Georgia
 College Park station (California), a Caltrain station in College Park, California
 College Park–University of Maryland station, a Washington Metro and MARC station in College Park, Maryland

See also
 College Station (disambiguation)
 University station (disambiguation)